Daria Nicolodi (19 June 1950 – 26 November 2020) was an Italian television and film actress and screenwriter.

Early life and career 

Daria Nicolodi was born in Florence on 19 June 1950. Her father was a Florentine lawyer and her mother, Fulvia, was a scholar of ancient languages. Her maternal grandfather was composer Alfredo Casella. She moved to Rome in the late 1960s.

In 1970, she participated in the television variety show Babau in four episodes written by Paolo Poli and Ida Omboni and directed by Vito Molinari. Because of program content deemed outrageous at the time, the show was shelved and only broadcast by RAI six years later. In the early 1970s, Nicolodi had some significant work in the cinema and theater under the guidance of Elio Petri. Also in the same year, Nicolodi participated in some TV productions, such as the serial story Nicotera, Without a Trace with Rossano Brazzi (1972), Portrait of a Veiled Woman with Nino Castelnuovo (1975), the drama Saturnino Farandola with Mariano Rigillo (1978), and Rosaura at 10 (1981).

Nicolodi starred in five films directed by Dario Argento between 1975 and 1987: Deep Red (1975), Inferno (1980), Tenebrae (1982), Phenomena (1985) and Opera (1987). Nicolodi starred in Shock (1977), the final film of Italian horror auteur Mario Bava. After her relationship with Argento ended in 1985, Nicolodi participated in such films as Paganini Horror, The Picture of Joy, Macaroni, The End Is Known, Notes of Love and in films directed by her daughter Asia Argento. In 2007, Nicolodi made a comeback to the cinema, working with her daughter Asia in Dario Argento's Mother of Tears, the sequel to Suspiria and Inferno.

Personal life 

In the early 1970s, she had a relationship with the sculptor Mario Ceroli; they had a daughter, Anna, who was born in 1973 and died in a 1994 car accident. Nicolodi had a professional and romantic relationship with director Dario Argento; they met in 1974 during casting for the film Deep Red, and their daughter Asia was born in 1975. They separated in 1985. Asia had a daughter of her own; she named her Anna after her half-sister.

Nicolodi died in Rome on 26 November 2020 at the age of 70. The cause of her death has not been publicly disclosed.

Recognition 
In 2012, Nicolodi was highlighted in the retrospective Argento: Il Cinema Nel Sangue at the Museum of Arts and Design in New York City. The retrospective celebrated the influence of the Argento family on filmmaking in Italy and around the world. It highlighted Nicolodi's contribution to Dario Argento's films as well as that of his father (Salvatore), brother (Claudio) and daughter (Asia).

Filmography

References

External links 

Official website

1950 births
2020 deaths
20th-century Italian actresses
21st-century Italian actresses
Accademia Nazionale di Arte Drammatica Silvio D'Amico alumni
Italian film actresses
Italian film producers
Italian television actresses
Italian screenwriters
Actors from Florence
Italian women screenwriters
Film people from Florence